Grantville station is a station on San Diego Trolley's Green Line in the middle class residential Grantville neighborhood of San Diego, California. It is one of the San Diego Trolley network's newer stations, having opened in 2005.

The station is elevated and has side platforms with two railroad tracks passing between them. The station is located in the middle of a long, tall viaduct taking the trolley line over the Interstate 8 freeway. The station is located on Alvarado Canyon Road near Fairmount Avenue.


Station layout
There are two tracks, each served by a side platform.

See also
 List of San Diego Trolley stations

References

External links 
 Grantville Trolley Station / Alvarado Creek Revitalization Plan

Green Line (San Diego Trolley)
San Diego Trolley stations in San Diego
Railway stations in the United States opened in 2005
2005 establishments in California